Rancho San Jacinto Viejo was a  Mexican land grant in present-day Riverside County, California given in 1842 by Governor Pro-tem Manuel Jimeno to José Antonio Estudillo.  At the time of the US Patent, Rancho San Jacinto Viejo was a part of San Diego County.  The County of Riverside was created by the California Legislature in 1893 by taking land from both San Bernardino and San Diego Counties.  The grant encompassed present-day Hemet and San Jacinto.

History
José María Estudillo was the captain of the Presidio of San Diego. His eldest son, José Joaquín Estudillo (1800 – 1852) was the grantee of  Rancho San Leandro. José Antonio Estudillo (1805 – 1852) was his second son. In 1824, José Antonio Estudillo, a lieutenant in the Mexican army, married María Victoria Dominguez. María Victoria's father, Juan José Dominguez, was the grantee of Rancho San Pedro. José Antonio Estudillo was appointed administrator and major domo at Mission San Luis Rey in 1840.

With the cession of California to the United States following the Mexican-American War, the 1848 Treaty of Guadalupe Hidalgo provided that the land grants would be honored.  As required by the Land Act of 1851, a claim for Rancho San Jacinto Viejo was filed with the Public Land Commission in 1852,  and the grant was patented to the heirs of José Antonio Estudillo in 1880.

See also
Rancho San Jacinto Nuevo y Potrero
Rancho San Jacinto Sobrante
Rancho San Jacinto y San Gorgonio
Ranchos of California
List of Ranchos of California

References

San Jacinto Viejo
San Jacinto Viejo
San Jacinto Mountains
Hemet, California
1842 establishments in Alta California
San Jacinto, California